Demetrin Leandro Veal (born August 11, 1981) is a former American football defensive tackle. He was drafted by the Atlanta Falcons in the seventh round of the 2003 NFL Draft. He played college football at Tennessee.

Veal was also a member of the Baltimore Ravens, Denver Broncos, Tennessee Titans, and Florida Tuskers.

1981 births
Living people
Sportspeople from Salvador, Bahia
Players of American football from California
American football defensive ends
American football defensive tackles
Cerritos Falcons football players
Tennessee Volunteers football players
Atlanta Falcons players
Baltimore Ravens players
Brazilian players of American football
Denver Broncos players
Tennessee Titans players
Florida Tuskers players
Omaha Nighthawks players